Scotch and Milk is an album by the American jazz saxophonist/flautist Cecil Payne, recorded in 1996 and released by the Delmark label the following year.

Reception

AllMusic reviewer Alex Henderson stated: "Payne was 73 when he recorded Scotch and Milk, a fine hard bop date  ... Payne's chops are in top shape on this 1996 date, and the veteran saxman plays with a lot of passion ... Nothing groundbreaking takes places on Scotch and Milk; most of the material could have been recorded for Blue Note in the 1950s or 1960s instead of 1996. Scotch and Milk is a perfect example of a veteran improviser excelling by sticking with what he does best".

Track listing
All compositions by Cecil Payne, except where indicated.
 "Scotch and Milk" – 9:04
 "Wilhelmenia" – 8:46
 "I'm Goin' In" – 9:57
 "If I Should Lose You" (Ralph Rainger, Leo Robin) – 5:16
 "Que Pasaning" – 8:09
 "Cit Sac" – 11:18
 "Lady Nia" – 8:13
 "Et Vous Too, Cecil?" – 10:26

Personnel
Cecil Payne - baritone saxophone, flute
Marcus Belgrave – trumpet 
Eric Alexander, Lin Halliday – tenor saxophone
Harold Mabern – piano 
John Ore – bass
Joe Farnsworth – drums

References

1997 albums
Delmark Records albums
Cecil Payne albums
Albums produced by Bob Koester